William Blois, or Deye, was one of the two MPs for Ipswich in the English parliaments from 1661 to 1670 and Suffolk in 1654 and 1656.

References

Blois